Old Clothes is a 1925 American silent drama film directed by Edward F. Cline and starring Jackie Coogan and Joan Crawford.

This was the first film in which Crawford was credited with her new name — Joan Crawford.  She had been renamed by the studio, who deemed her birth name, Lucille LeSueur, as sounding unfit for a movie star.

Plot
Tim Kelly and Max Ginsberg have struck it rich by investing in copper stock.   But when the stock takes a dive, they are compelled to go back into their former profession — junk dealers. They take in the destitute Mary Riley as a boarder and she hits it off so well with them that she winds up becoming a partner in their rag & junk company.  Mary falls in love with a man named Nathan Burke , the son of wealthy parents. Nathan's mother, however, disapproves of Mary.  Eventually it is revealed that Mrs. Burke came from a poor background herself, and her long-ago sweetheart was Max. After this discovery, she gives the couple her blessings. The copper stock soars in value once again, so Kelly and Ginsberg are back in the money.

Cast
Jackie Coogan as Tim Kelly
Max Davidson as Max Ginsberg
Joan Crawford as Mary Kelly
Allan Forrest as Nathan Burke
Lillian Elliott as Mrs. Burke
James Mason as Dapper Dan
Stanton Heck as The adjuster
Dynamite the Horse

References

External links

1925 films
1925 drama films
Silent American drama films
American silent feature films
1920s English-language films
American black-and-white films
Films directed by Edward F. Cline
Metro-Goldwyn-Mayer films
1920s American films